Hook is a village and community on the Western Cleddau, Pembrokeshire, Wales, in the ecclesiastical parish of Llangwm.

Name
The name could be derived from the nearby hook-shaped peninsula.

History
Hook Woods are shown on a 1578 parish map.
An 1833 gazetteer described Hook Quay as a place for loading coal for shipping. Although there is little or no trace of it to be found today, Hook once had a worldwide reputation as a mining village; anthracite was mined and exported across the world. Maps drawn in the 19th century show collieries.

Demography
The population of the community was 656 in 2001. Together with the communities of Freystrop and Llangwm, it makes up the Pembrokeshire ward of Llangwm. It rose to 838 in 2011.

Amenities
Hook has a school, two places of worship, a social club and a wide range of organisations ranging from short mat bowls to a History Society, and a long-established cricket club with trophy-winning men's, ladies' and junior teams.

Notes

External links 
Hook village website
Photographs of Hook and surrounding area on Geograph

Villages in Pembrokeshire
Communities in Pembrokeshire